Franklin and the Green Knight (also known as Franklin and the Green Knight: The Movie) is a 2000 Canadian animated adventure film. The first Franklin film, Franklin and the Green Knight was released direct to video and DVD. The movie follows Franklin setting out to heal his grandmother after she turned ill with his best friends and Snail. It has since aired on Noggin and Nick Jr. in the United States in 2004, and Canada's Family Channel.

Plot
Franklin Turtle is excited about the coming of spring, but it is still winter and Franklin's family has to hibernate. The family tell Franklin about the Green Knight to cheer him up when he had healed the King when he was ill and was declared as hero. The next day, Franklin plays pirate with his best friend beaver and snail and finds a piece of green armor on the ground. He decides to return the green armor, but don't know how to let everyone know if it is theirs. When Franklin visits his grandmother's to ask what green armor is this, it reveals that Franklin's grandmother is in bed sick and Ill. Paying a visit about her illness, he learns that she is not being healed and doesn't get better. One evening during supper, Franklin uses a note to his grandmother but is covered in paint by Harriet. However, unable to know what to do, he questions a medical cure for his grandmother. Franklin's father then explains that the medical cure is at the top of the mountain and is a bottle of Medicine that can heal every animal that is ill. He decides to go find the medicine but is aware that a snowstorm will be coming. While the rest of the animals use protective things in order to hibernate, Franklin is asked to stay in his room before the snow storm hits, but he is desperate to heal his grandmother knowing she will not get well if he doesn't bring the bottle of Medicine.

Ignoring his family's desperate warnings, Franklin begins to set out but can't do it alone so he invites his friends to help him. After getting lost in the snow storm and losing their lantern, they take shelter in a fox's home who begins to treat them rudely by handing meat and oatmeal. The next day, Franklin's family is still worried about the snow storm and Franklin and call Mr Badger to find Franklin. Franklin and his friends begin to continue their Journey but Snail is captured after going in a different route. Hearing his cries, they find him in a bird's nest, but are scared away by a crow which makes Franklin upset when he has not had the chance to stay with snail. He then cheered up by his friends and the fox who arrives to apologize for his mean treatment. Together, they use a stick to grab Snail carefully where the Crow and the birds chase them, but they are able to escape and take shelter before the blurry snow storm begins to hit. The fox gives Franklin a knitted stuffed animal named Sam, saying that he used to use it as a kid but not anymore. Mr Badger then goes back still with not a single search for Franklin, and the family are forced to care for Franklin's grandmother who says that her son must be out there somewhere.

Franklin and his friends begin to continue when the snow storm begins to die down. They manage to go across a river but only Beaver slips with Badger and they end up on a wild ride on a log. Franklin chases them along the way and saves them from an upcoming waterfall. When they reach the mountain, Franklin and his friends climb to the top, but Sam drops from Franklin's pocket and Franklin goes down to get it. Unfortunately, Sam is squeezed by two rocks, but snail manages to help by using a stick to grab ahold of Sam's knitted ears. When Franklin finally climbs back to the top, he uses his creative mind to reach the medicine. But as he is going to reach it, the rock that is holding the medicine tips off the mountain causing the medicine to Tumble into the abyss. The friends are immediately saddened when the medicine disappears and give up enough hope to heal Franklin's grandmother and climb down the mountain. But as they are going to return home, it reveals that the medicine has landed in Fox's paw, not the ground. Franklin and his friends cheer and return home just as Franklin's grandmother gives him a hug and gets healed by the medicine making her stronger. Then Franklin remembers the green armor and goes to the yard to get it. When he returns, he questions once again what is the green armor for before Franklin's mother explains that it's for him for being a good Knight. Franklin blushes and the movie ends with flowers blushing from the ground and spring appearing in the air.

Voice actors
 Noah Reid as Franklin Turtle
 Luca Perlman as Bear
 Olivia Garratt as Goose
 Kyle Fairlie as Rabbit
 Kristen Bone as Snail
 Leah Cudmore as Beaver
 Richard Newman as Mr. Turtle
 Elizabeth Brown as Mrs. Turtle
 Juan Chioran as Green Knight
 Paul Essiembre as Squire
 Jonathan Wilson as Goblin
 Gary Krawford as Lynx
 Ruby Smith-Merovitz as Badger
 Ali Mukaddam as Fox
 James Rankin as Mr. Owl
Corinne Conley as Granny Turtle
 Valerie Boyle as Mrs. Beaver
 Adrian Truss as Mr. Beaver
 Elizabeth Hanna as Mrs. Fox and Eagle
 Catherine Disher as Mrs. Goose
 Paul Haddad as Mr. Fox
 Jim Jones as Mr. Gopher
 Debra McGrath as Mrs. Warbler
 Annick Obonsawin as Armadillo
 Shirley Douglas as Narrator
 Derek McGrath as Yatterwoof (Mid-credits scene)

Songs
 "Brothers and Sisters" by Leah Cudmore, Laura Lynn, Luca Perlman, Noah Reid, Liz Soderberg and Cassandra Vasik
 "Spring Where Are You?" by Kristen Bone, Leah Cudmore, Laura Lynn, Luca Perlman, Noah Reid, Liz Soderberg and Cassandra Vasik
 "I Wonder" by Noah Reid and Kristen Bone
 "Franklin Theme" by Bruce Cockburn (Ending credits)

References

External links

 TV.com Guide
 

2000 direct-to-video films
2000 animated films
Canadian direct-to-video films
Canadian animated feature films
Canadian children's animated films
Animated films based on animated series
Animated films about children
Animated films about turtles
Animated films about friendship
Films based on television series
Direct-to-video animated films
Films about turtles
Animated films based on children's books
Arthurian films
Nelvana films
Universal Pictures direct-to-video films
Universal Pictures direct-to-video animated films
2000s children's animated films
Franklin the Turtle (books)
2000 films
2000s English-language films
2000s American films
2000s Canadian films